Orbital Media Inc. was a video-game company based in Calgary, Alberta, Canada that was founded in 2003. It developed games mainly for Nintendo handheld platforms. It became defunct in 2014.

List of Games Developed 

Racing Gears Advance for Game Boy Advance

Scurge: Hive for Game Boy Advance and Nintendo DS

Juka and the Monophonic Menace for Game Boy Advance

Pirate Battle for Nintendo DS, previously slated for Game Boy Advance (Presumably canceled)

Racing Gears DS for Nintendo DS (Presumably canceled)

References

External links 
 IGN on Pirate Battle

Defunct video game companies of Canada
Video game development companies